The History and Adventures of an Atom is a novel by Tobias Smollett, first published in 1769.  The novel satirises English politics during the Seven Years' War.

Summary
The novel is an it-narrative, narrated by an atom in the body of a London haberdasher, who is the purported editor of the novel. The atom describes events it witnessed in ancient Japan, which are in fact allegories for British politics at the time of the novel's composition.

William Pitt, 1st Earl of Chatham appears as Taycho, and other politicians, monarchs and nations under a light disguise of made-up names. It includes some comments on the Kingdom of Great Britain's growing problems with its American colonies.

Many "keys" have been published to decode which characters are meant to represent real people.

Publication history
The book was published anonymously in 1769.  Smollett's authorship of the book has been disputed, but it is generally included and discussed among his works.

The first scholarly edition of the book was published in 1988, edited by Robert Adams Day and O. M. Brack Jr.

Reception
Writing in 1821, Sir Walter Scott wrote, "The chief purpose of the work (besides that of giving the author the opportunity to raise his hand, like that of Ishmael, against every man) is to inspire a national horror of continental connexions."

References

External links
  Complete online text (public domain)
The History and Adventures of an Atom

1769 novels
Novels by Tobias Smollett
British political novels
Seven Years' War
18th-century British novels
Novels set in Japan
Works published anonymously
Japan in non-Japanese culture